Harun Ateş (born 9 March 1968) is a Turkish taekwondo practitioner. He competed in the men's finweight at the 1988 Summer Olympics.

References

External links
 

1968 births
Place of birth missing (living people)
Living people
Turkish male taekwondo practitioners
Olympic taekwondo practitioners of Turkey
Taekwondo practitioners at the 1988 Summer Olympics